= Potočani, Vukosavlje =

Potočani
- Village
- Location within Bosnia and Herzegovina
- Coordinates: 45°02′28″N 18°16′10″E
- Country: Bosnia and Herzegovina
- Entity: Republika Srpska
- Municipality: Vukosavlje
- Established: 1995

Area
  - Total: 12.95 km^{2} (5.00 sq mi)
  - Land: 12.95 km^{2} (5.00 sq mi)

Population (2013)
  - Total: 180
  - Density: 14/km^{2} (36/sq mi)

Potočani is a village in the Municipality of Vukosavlje in Republika Srpska, an entity of Bosnia and Herzegovina. According to the 2013 census, the population was 180.

== Bibliography ==
- Резултати пописа: градови, опшптине, насељена мјеста (PDF). Banja Luka: Republika Srpska Institute of Statistics. 2017.
